Jason King is a British television series starring Peter Wyngarde as the eponymous character. It was produced by ITC Entertainment and had a single season of 26 one-hour episodes that aired from 1971 to 1972. It was shown internationally as well, and has been released on DVD in the United Kingdom, the United States, Australia and Germany.

Overview
The series featured the further adventures of the title character who had first appeared in Department S (1969). In that series he was a dilettante dandy and author of a series of adventure novels, working as part of a team of investigators. In Jason King he had left that service to concentrate on writing the adventures of Mark Caine, who closely resembled Jason King in looks, manner, style, and personality. None of the other regular characters from Department S appeared in this series, although Department S itself is occasionally referred to in dialogue.

In the course of visiting international locations as part of his research, or through being summoned by people needing assistance, King would be frequently embroiled in adventure stories featuring glamorous women, exotic locations (for the era), menacing villains, political turmoil, or espionage intrigue.

The first episode depicted King's retelling of a Mark Caine novel to a television executive, alternating between King's interpretation of events, and the television executive's version. King's version showed style and class, while the executive's version featured added suspense, more cliches, and had the women in more revealing costumes. In the footage representing both men's vision of the novel adapted for the screen, Mark Caine was portrayed by Wyngarde.

The titles of the Mark Caine books often consisted of four short words, in the manner of some of Ian Fleming's James Bond novels. The Mark Caine title mentioned most often in the series was Index Finger Left Hand; another was To China Yours Sincerely (parodying Fleming's From Russia With Love).

Subsequent episodes featured Wyngarde playing King trying to write his novels and being pressured by his publisher Nicola Harvester about deadlines. King, however, was usually distracted by beautiful women and the adventures of his normal life, and was sometimes tricked by Ryland of the British Government into assisting the Government in international political matters: all of which later found their way into the adventures of the fictional Mark Caine.

Cast

Peter Wyngarde as Jason King
Anne Sharp as Nicola Harvester
Ronald Lacey as Ryland
Dennis Price as Sir Brian

Production
The series was created by Dennis Spooner and like its predecessor was made by Lew Grade's ITC Entertainment production company (which had become successful with such series as The Saint and Danger Man). However, unlike previous ITC series which were shot on 35mm film, Jason King was filmed on 16mm to cut costs. Episodes were written specifically to include travel to various European locations to which Peter Wyngarde had, before the series, been brought for outdoor location filming; these shots were then included within the filmed narratives.

Episodes

Legacy
King's choice of fashion was named by Mike Myers as an inspiration for his popular movie character Austin Powers.

An analogue of Jason King appears in the comic book series The Invisibles, written by Grant Morrison as "Mr. Six", the so-called "Last of the International Playboys", and member of "Division X".

In the X-Men comics, the character of Jason Wyngarde (aka Mastermind) was partially inspired by Jason King and Peter Wyngarde. Mastermind had first appeared in the 1960s, but took on the appearance and identity of Jason Wyngarde in the build-up to the X-Men's first confrontation with the Hellfire Club in the late 1970s. Wyngarde had played the leader of another Hellfire club in "A Touch of Brimstone", an episode of The Avengers, in which Diana Rigg appeared in a leather costume that Jean Grey adopted as the Hellfire Club's Black Queen.

He is also one of the inspirations (especially his clothes) for Kim Newman's psychic crime fighter and secret agent Richard Jeperson.

Parody
The Two Ronnies performed a sketch entitled 'Jason King', with Ronnie Corbett putting on all the airs and graces of King and Ronnie Barker playing a suspect in a murder investigation, during their third series in 1973.

Jason King was also the basis for Jason Bentley, played by Peter Richardson in the Comic Strip Presents episode Detectives on the Edge of a Nervous Breakdown (1993). Wyngarde said in a BBC television interview when this episode was originally transmitted that he was flattered by the affectionate parody, but insisted that Jason King would never wear crushed velvet.

References

External links

 Paul Lewis, 2009: Review of the Network DVD release of the complete series. DVDCompare

1971 British television series debuts
1972 British television series endings
1970s British drama television series
British crime television series
Espionage television series
Television series by ITC Entertainment
ITV television dramas
British television spin-offs
English-language television shows
Television shows shot at Associated British Studios